The Canal des Étangs was a canal in southern France.  It is now part of the Canal du Rhône à Sète along with the Canal de Beaucaire.  It was created by the state of Languedoc.  The project consisted of enlarging ancient medieval channels through and between the shallow lakes and salt marshes, connecting Sète and Aigues-Mortes.

En Route
 PK 51 Aigues-Mortes
 PK 61.5 Grande Motte
 PK 70.5 Pérols
 PK 75.5 Palavas-les-Flots
 PK 79 Villeneuve-lès-Maguelone
 PK 92-93 Frontignan
 PK 98-100 Sète

See also
 List of canals in France

References

Etangs